A unified team of North and South Korea has played at certain sports competitions under the name Korea.

History
Since the conclusion of the Korean War, North and South Korea have existed as separate countries, with both claiming to be the sole legitimate government of all Korea. Both nations participate in international sport as individual countries; unified teams are exceptions to this practice rather than the norm. Joint teams have been seen as geopolitical gestures.

A unified team under the name Korea (KOR) competed in 1991 World Table Tennis Championships and FIFA World Youth Championship with athletes from both North and South Korea. In 1991, the team used the Unification Flag and the anthem "Arirang".

At the 2018 Winter Olympics in Pyeongchang in South Korea, the Koreas marched together at the Parade of Nations under the Unification Flag. A unified team played in the women's ice hockey tournament as Korea under the IOC country code COR, using the Unification Flag and the "Arirang" anthem. For other disciplines, the two Koreas retained separate national teams. At the 2018 World Team Table Tennis Championships, the two Koreas entered separate teams, but when they were paired against each other at the quarter-final of the women's event, they negotiated instead to field a joint team for the semifinal, with the agreement of the International Table Tennis Federation.

The two Koreas also initially agreed to form a unified Korea team at the 2018 East Asian Judo Championships in Mongolia. Plans to compete under a unified flag were eventually scrapped due to a dispute over the flag.

Four unified teams also participated in the international table tennis event, 2018 Korea Open. The unified Korean women's doubles team won gold, the first gold medal won by a unified Korean team since the 1991 World Table Tennis Championships, while the unified men's doubles team won bronze.

FIBA allowed the participation of unified Korean team at the 2019 FIBA Women's Asia Cup. However, no unified Korean team entered the basketball tournament.

Records

Multi-sport events

2018 Winter Olympics

2018 Asian Games

2018 Asian Para Games

Single sports events

World Table Tennis Championships

ITTF World Tour

Single sport team tournaments

FIFA World Youth Championship

World Men's Handball Championship

Names
In English, the team is named Korea, a term shared between North Korea and South Korea.

In East Asian languages where the names of the countries are significantly different (North Korea's 조선/朝鮮/Chosŏn versus South Korea's 한국/韓國/Hanguk), the team name uses an English transliteration. For example, during the 2018 Winter Olympics in South Korea, the team used the name 코리아 Koria; and during the 1991 World Table Tennis Championships in Japan, the team used the name コリア Koria.

During the 2007 Asian Winter Games opening ceremony in China where North and South Korea marched together, their placard displayed only the English name "Korea", with no Chinese-language name present. All other teams' placards displayed an English-language name over a Chinese-language name. The parade order was unaffected as it used English alphabetical order. There were no announcers present to call out the names of any of the teams, only commentators. 

During the 2005 East Asian Games opening ceremony in Macau, North and South Korea also marched together and their placard displayed the English name "Korea".

See also

Korea national under-20 football team
Korea women's national basketball team
Korea men's national handball team
Korea women's national ice hockey team
Korea
North Korea–South Korea relations
United Team of Germany

References

 
1991 establishments in Asia
2018 Winter Olympics
North Korea–South Korea relations
Sport in Korea